The Funeral of the Virgin Mary is a 1605-1609 oil on canvas painting by Ludovico Carracci, now in the Galleria nazionale di Parma.

Caracci produced this work, its pendant The Apostles at the Virgin's Tomb and other frescoes for the chancel of the Duomo di Piacenza, dedicated to the Virgin Mary. They were commissions from Claudio Rangoni, bishop and nobleman. Their dating is based on letters from the artist himself, who in 1606 wrote to Ferrante Carlo that he was to busy to send the painting he requested "having already begun a large work for the most illustrious Bishop of Piacenza". Following the Treaty of Tolentino and looting by Napoleon's troops, Funeral and Apostles were both taken to France in 1796. Only in 1816 were they and other works returned to Piacenza, where they were exhibited in the new Galleria Ducale.

References

Bibliography (in Italian)
  Daniela Ferriani, Scheda dell'opera, in Fornari Schianchi (a cura di), Galleria Nazionale di Parma. Catalogo delle opere dall'Antico al Cinquecento, Milano, 1997.
  A.O. Quintavalle, La Regia Galleria di Parma, Roma, 1939.
  A. Stanzani, Il regesto della vita e delle opere di Ludovico, 1993, pp. 199–268.

External links

Collections of the Galleria nazionale di Parma
Paintings by Ludovico Carracci
Paintings of the Virgin Mary
1600s paintings